Losing Control is a 2011 American romantic comedy film.

Losing Control may refer to:

Film and TV
Losing Control, 1998 erotic film with Kira Reed Lorsch
Losing Control (TV series), Nigerian TV series

Music
 Losing Control, album by Barney Bentall and the Legendary Hearts 1982
 "Losing Control", song by Amii Stewart from Try Love
 "Losing Control", song by Audio Adrenaline from Until My Heart Caves In, 2005
 "Losing Control", song by Boy George from U Can Never B2 Straight 2002  
 "Losing Control", song by Ak'Sent
 "Losing Control", song by Escape the Fate from Ungrateful
 "Losing Control", song by Broken Bones
 "Loosen' Control", song by Snoop Dogg 2001
 "Losin Control", song by American rapper Russ 2015

See also
Lose Control (disambiguation)